Kumargah is a gorge and mountain, 2,181 metres high, located in Balkh, Afghanistan.

References
 https://web.archive.org/web/20101027185129/http://earthsearch.net/featureIndex.php?type=int&start=2581000&end=2582000
 https://web.archive.org/web/20070628234601/http://plasma.nationalgeographic.com/mapmachine/

Landforms of Balkh Province
Two-thousanders of Afghanistan